Legalise Cannabis Australia, formerly the Help End Marijuana Prohibition (HEMP) Party, is an Australian political party. It has a number of policies that centre around the re-legalisation of cannabis for personal, medicinal and industrial uses in Australia.

The party's headquarters are based in Nimbin, New South Wales, which is known to have a high population of recreational cannabis users and hippies. Nimbin is also home to the MardiGrass cannabis festival.

History 
The party has been involved in Glenn Druery's Minor Party Alliance.

Formation 

The group was founded in 1993 by Nigel Quinlan, who ran as a candidate under the name Nigel Freemarijuana. In 2001, Freemarijuana's name was assessed by the Australian Electoral Commission as to whether it was suitable to be added to the electoral roll – the Commission found that it was, meaning Freemarijuana could run as an electoral candidate under the name.

Deregistration and re-registration 

In 2007, prior to the 2007 federal election, HEMP was de-registered as a political party by the Australian Electoral Commission after a random audit of its membership. The group re-applied for party registration in February 2010, but according to HEMP secretary Graham Askey, delays in processing their application meant that registration did not proceed in time before the 2010 federal election was called. It was formally re-registered on 23 September 2010.

Name change 

At the party's AGM held on 11 September 2021, a name change was proposed to change the party's name to Legalise Cannabis Australia, which was passed in a vote by party members.

State and territory affiliates
The party's current affiliates are the following:

Legalise Cannabis South Australia stood two candidates in the 2022 South Australian state election. These were lead candidate Damon Adams and second candidate Tyler Green. Neither were elected.

Electoral results 
HEMP has stood candidates in several federal and state elections, since its formation.

The party received a nationwide Senate vote of 0.71 percent at the 2013 federal election. Historically the party's best result was at the 1994 Elizabeth by-election in South Australia with a 5.37 percent primary vote.

For the 2016 federal election, the (HEMP) Party fielded two candidates for the Senate in New South Wales, but only one each in the Northern Territory, Queensland, South Australia, Tasmania and Western Australia. So that the candidates did not end up in the "ungrouped" column, they teamed up with the Australian Sex Party which also fielded a single senate candidate in most states. It also fielded a candidate for the Division of Solomon in the House of Representatives.

The HEMP Party scored well in the 2019 federal election with over 260,000 votes and 1.8% of the primary senate vote.

Michael Balderstone ran in the 2020 Eden-Monaro by-election and received 2.3% of votes beating out almost every other minor party.

At the 2021 Western Australian state election, the Party's local affiliate, Legalise Cannabis WA, were successful in gaining two seats in the Legislative Council, marking the first parliamentary representation for HEMP or its state affiliate parties.

At the 2022 Victorian state election the party had two candidates elected to the Legislative Council, David Ettershank and Rachel Payne.

Australian Senate

See also 

 Cannabis in Australia
 Drug policy reform
 Cannabis political parties

Notes

References

External links 
 Legalise Cannabis Australia

1993 establishments in Australia
Political parties established in 1993
Political parties in Australia
Cannabis political parties of Australia
1993 in cannabis
 
Drug culture
Cannabis culture
Single-issue political parties in Australia